Ambrosi's cave salamander or the Spezia cave salamander (Speleomantes ambrosii) is a species of salamander in the family Plethodontidae. Endemic to northwestern Italy, its natural habitats are temperate forests, rocky areas, caves, and subterranean habitats (other than caves). It is threatened by habitat loss.

Description
Ambrosi's cave salamander has short, stout limbs, pointed toes and a short tail and grows to around  including the tail. There is a ridge known as a canthus between the snout and the eye. The colour is variable, being brown to black with marbling, mottling or streaking in grey, green, yellow, red, pink or brown. Some individuals are a uniform brown or black colour. The underparts are also dark with paler markings.

Distribution and habitat
Ambrosi's cave salamander is endemic to a small area of northwestern Italy, occurring at scattered locations in La Spezia province. Despite its name, it is not restricted to caves though it retreats under stones, logs and into caverns in dry periods. In the southeast of its distribution, where its range overlaps that of the Italian cave salamander (Speleomantes italicus), the two species sometimes hybridise.

Behaviour
Ambrosi's cave salamander is found in moist environments where it is active by night on the ground, sometimes scrambling around in low vegetation. Males become sexually mature at four years and females at five. Longevity is estimated to be seventeen years.

Status
The International Union for Conservation of Nature has assessed the Ambrosi's cave salamander as being critically endangered. However it occurs in two protected areas, the Parco Nazionale delle Cinque Terre and the Parco naturale regionale delle Alpi Apuane. It is possible that the subspecies Speleomantes ambrosii bianchii may be reassigned to S. italicus, and if that were the case, its extent of occurrence would be reduced and its status would need to be reassessed.

References

Speleomantes
Cave salamanders
Amphibians of Europe
Endemic fauna of Italy
Amphibians described in 1954
Taxonomy articles created by Polbot